"Steamboat Bill" is a 1910 song with music by the vaudeville group The Leighton Brothers and lyrics by Ren Shields which became one of the first hit recordings in the United States through its 1911 recording by Arthur Collins. "Steamboat Bill" notably inspired two major works of American film with long-lasting influence: the 1928 Buster Keaton film Steamboat Bill, Jr. and Steamboat Willie, the first Mickey Mouse cartoon.

Content
The song is an extended reference to a famed 1870 race down the Mississippi River between two steamboats, the Robert E. Lee and the Natchez.

It imagines a fictional steamboat, the Whippoorwill, captained by "Mr. Steamboat Bill," who is determined to beat the record of the Robert E. Lee. He threatens his mates with death if they do not follow his orders and commands them to use cargo as fuel if they run out of coal.

A gambler from Louisville, Kentucky (home of the Kentucky Derby) places a bet against Bill that the Whippoorwill will be unable to beat the record. Bill's obsession with speed causes the steam engine to explode, killing them both. The final verses imagine Bill and the gambler ascending to heaven, and his wife telling their children she will seek out a new husband in the railroad industry.

Analysis
A 1965 article in the Journal of American Folklore refers to it as a "pseudo-Negro" song and a parody of "The Ballad of Casey Jones". More recently, R. John Brockmann has called into question the time period the song is set in, pointing out that boiler explosions had not been considered an issue for steamboat captains since the 1880s. Brockmann suggests that the song recalls memories of the mid-19th century when such explosions were common.

Recordings
Arthur Collins, a ragtime singer, sang for the first recording in 1911. The song was a longtime hit in Tin Pan Alley and was covered as late as 1951, by the Delmore Brothers.

Cultural impact
Bolstered by the Buster Keaton and Mickey Mouse references, the song created lasting interest in steamboats and showboats. At least one showboat was actually named after the fictional Whippoorwill. This boat met a disastrous fate when it was hit by the 1978 Whippoorwill tornado, killing 16 passengers and crew.

References

Songs about boats
Songs about death
Songs based on actual events
1910 songs